Ernst Alfred Philippson (6 April 1900 – 9 August 1993) was an American philologist who specialized in Germanic studies.

Biography
Ernst Alfred Philippson was born in Mönchengladbach, Germany on 6 April 1900 to a prominent Jewish family. He was the son of the dentist Ernst Moritz Philippson (1871-1924) and Johanna Mühlinghaus (1878-1945). He was the cousin of the distinguished geographer Alfred Philippson, and the husband of Margarete Josephine Hecker (1903-1989).

Since 1918, Philippson studied German, English and history at the universities of Bonn, Munich and Cologne. He received his Ph.D. in German philology at Cologne in 1924 under the supervision of Friedrich von der Leyen with a thesis on fairy tales.

Since 1928, Philippson was a lecturer in English philology at the University of Cologne. He emigrated to the United States in September 1933, and subsequently served as assistant professor of German at the University of Michigan. During World War II he taught German in the United States Army.

Philippson transferred to the University of Illinois at Urbana–Champaign in 1947, where he served as Associate Professor (1947-1951) and Professor (1951-1968) of Germanic Philology. Philippson specialized in the study of German and English literature, and Germanic religion. Elmer H. Antonsen, one of his students, replaced him upon his retirement at the University of Illinois. Philippson was deeply involved with the Journal of English and Germanic Philology, where he served as Editor (1953-1957) and Co-editor (1957-1971). He was a member of several learned societies, including American Association of Teachers of German, the Modern Language Association and the Linguistic Society of America.

Philippson retired in 1968, but continued to lecture at Columbia University after his retirement. He died in Urbana, Illinois on 9 August 1993.

Selected works
Der Märchentypus von König Drosselbart (Greifswald 1923)
Der Germanische Mütter- und Matronenkult am Niederrhein. In: Germanic Review Bd. 19, 1944, S. 81–142.
Germanisches Heidentum bei den Angelsachsen (Leipzig, B. Tauchnitz, 1929. Nachdruck: New York, Johnson Reprint Corp., 1966)
Die Genealogie der Götter in germanischer Religion, Mythologie und Theologie (Urbana, PLMA, 1953)

Sources

 Johanna Philippson: The Philippsons, a German-Jewish Family 1775–1933. In: Leo Baeck Institute Yearbook  7 (1962), 95–118.
 Christoph König (Hrsg.), unter Mitarbeit von Birgit Wägenbaur u. a.: Internationales Germanistenlexikon 1800–1950. Band 2: H–Q. De Gruyter, Berlin/New York 2003, S. 1405–1406. (in German)

1900 births
1993 deaths
American editors
American philologists
American people of German-Jewish descent
Germanic studies scholars
Germanists
People from Mönchengladbach
University of Cologne alumni
University of Illinois Urbana-Champaign faculty
University of Illinois Urbana-Champaign Department of German faculty
University of Michigan faculty
Professors of German in the United States
Writers on Germanic paganism
20th-century philologists
German emigrants to the United States
Linguists from the United States